Adventure Bike Rider or ABR is a UK bimonthly motorcycling newspaper published by Adventurize Ltd, based in Stratford-upon-Avon, United Kingdom.

The brand has expanded to include the ABR website, ABR Mobile app, iPhone app, the 'ABR Garage' Podcast and the annual Adventure Bike Rider Festival held in Ragley Hall, Warwickshire.

References

Motorcycling mass media
2010 establishments in the United Kingdom
Organisations based in Warwickshire